is a station in Ōda, Shimane Prefecture, Japan.

Lines
 West Japan Railway Company (JR West)
 San'in Main Line

Surrounding

  Kotogahama Beach

Adjacent stations

Railway stations in Japan opened in 1918
Railway stations in Shimane Prefecture
Sanin Main Line